The Holden Commodore (VZ) is a full-size car that was produced by Holden from 2004 to 2006 as a sedan and to 2007 as a wagon and Ute sold alongside the new VE series. It was the fourth and final iteration of the third generation of the Commodore and the last to spawn a coupé variant. Its range continued to include the luxury variants, Holden Berlina (VZ) and Holden Calais (VZ).

Overview 

Released in August 2004, the VZ series was a minor facelift of the previous VY series that featured a new V6 engine in different tune guises. The powerplants included , 3.6-litre Alloytec V6 engines in place of the older 3.8-litre Ecotec V6. Other changes to the V6 was the loss of the supercharger that was included in the S models from the VT to VY, this was also dropped with the 3.8-litre and would not be used with the new 3.6. These new Alloytec DOHC engines have carried on through to the Holden Commodore (VE) which was released in July 2006. A new 5L40-E 5-speed automatic transmission was introduced on the sports and luxury V6 variants.

The advanced 3.6-litre Alloytec engines were more powerful, responsive and fuel-efficient than the outgoing Ecotec V6. To achieve , the Alloytec V6 gains variable valve timing on both inlet and exhaust sides as well as a dual stage intake manifold, while the  version retains variable valve timing on the inlet side only. Selected models bring advanced active safety features that electronically assist the driver to maintain vehicle control in emergency situations.

The VZ Commodore was available in several model variations, most of which carried over from the VY range, with the exception of the newly introduced SV6, a specification level that replaced the S range. All models in the Commodore range (Executive, Acclaim, Berlina, Calais, SV6, SV8 and SS) were available as sedans, while wagon variants of the Executive, Acclaim and Berlina were available. Berlina and Calais models were not badged or marketed as Commodores. The VZ was the last Commodore line-up to use the Executive and Acclaim nameplates.

The VZ is notable for being the only Commodore series of recent times to not officially introduce a Series II update to the range, however, a number of mechanical changes were made in January 2006, designated MY06. Holden introduced the new L76 6.0-litre V8 to its range. The V8 has been slightly detuned, and both Displacement on Demand and variable valve timing have been removed.

Sales of the VZ series failed to match those of the preceding VY in light of rising small car sales, higher fuel prices and growing interest in the whole new replacement, the VE series.

The VZ Commodore sedans were superseded by the VE series in July 2006, whilst the wagon and utility ranges lived on for almost another year. VZ Ute production ended in August 2007, whilst the last wagon rolled off Holden's Elizabeth plant line on 6 September 2007.

Models

Executive 

The Executive was the baseline model. Pricing for the Executive started from A$33,160. The VZ series was the last one to include this nameplate, which was first introduced in 1984.

The Commodore Executive standard features included:
 3.6 L  Alloytec V6 engine (updated to 3.6 L  Alloytec V6 engine in January 2006)
 4-speed automatic transmission
 Anti-lock braking system (ABS)
 Auto headlights
 Brake assist (BA)
 Cruise control
 Driver's and passenger's airbags
 Electronic brakeforce distribution (EBD)
 Front power windows
 Power antenna
 Power socket in centre console
 Quad cupholders
 Security system
 Single disc CD player
 Steering wheel audio controls
 Trip computer
 15-inch steel wheels

The Commodore Executive optional features included:
 Air conditioning
 Alloy wheels
 Country pack suspension
 FE2 sports suspension
 Rear park assist (available on sedan only)
 Satellite navigation (only available on the sedan)
 Side Impact Airbags (SIAB)

Acclaim 

The Acclaim sat above the Executive in the specification level hierarchy of the VZ range, and was priced from A$39,050. The VZ series was the last one to include this nameplate, which was first introduced in 1993.

The Commodore Acclaim standard features supersede and add to those of the Commodore Executive variant:
 Air conditioning
 Electronic Brake Assist (EBA) (available on sedan only)
 Electronic Stability Program (ESP) which incorporated:
 Traction control system (available on sedan only)
 Front and rear power windows
 Rear park assist (available on sedan only)
 Side Impact Airbags (SIAB)
 Traction control (available on station wagon only)
 15x7 inch alloy wheels

The Commodore Acclaim optional features included:
 Alloy wheels
 FE2 sports suspension
 Satellite navigation

SV6 

The SV6 was the baseline sports variant. Pricing for the SV6 started from A$38,990.

The SV6 features included:
 3.6 L  Alloytec High Output V6. 
 6-speed manual transmission (option of 5-speed automatic transmission)
 Air conditioning
 Anti-lock braking system (ABS)
 Auto headlights
 Brake assist (BA)
 CD player
 Cruise control
 Driver's and passenger's airbags (side airbags added from late 2005)
 Electronic brakeforce distribution (EBD)
 FE2 sports suspension
 Front fog lamps
 Front and rear power windows
 Independent rear suspension (IRS)
 Limited slip differential (added from 2005)
 Leather steering wheel
 Power antenna
 Security system
 Sports body kit and rear spoiler
 Traction control system (TCS)
 Trip computer
 17 inch alloy wheels
 Leather upholstery (optional)
 Sunroof (optional)

SV8 
The SV8 was the mid-range sports variant, and was priced from A$41,990. Early VZ versions of the SV8 continued with the VY SV8 theme, being essentially an Executive with a V8 engine, rear spoiler, unique 17 inch alloy wheels and SV6 tail lights. This specification was later upgraded as a running change to match the equipment levels and appearance of the SV6, which remained a step down from the SS.

SV8 features included:
 5.7 L  LS1 V8 (until 31 December 2005, then 6.0 L  L76 V8 from 1 January 2006)
 6-speed manual transmission (option of 4-speed automatic transmission)
 Air conditioning
 Anti-lock braking system (ABS)
 Auto headlights
 Brake assist (BA)
 CD player
 Cruise control
 Driver's and passenger's airbags
 Electronic brakeforce distribution (EBD)
 FE2 sports suspension
 Front power windows
 Independent rear suspension (IRS)
 Limited slip differential (LSD)
 Power antenna
 Security system
 Traction control system (TCS)
 Trip computer
 17 inch alloy wheels

SS 

The SS was the flagship sports variant of the VZ range. Pricing for the SS started from A$50,990.

SS included such features as:
 5.7 L  LS1 V8 (until 31 December 2005, then 6.0 L  L76 V8 from 1 January 2006)
 6-speed manual transmission (option of 4-speed automatic transmission)
 6 disc in-dash CD player
 Air conditioning
 alloy pedals
 Anti-lock braking system (ABS)
 Auto headlights
 Brake assist (BA)
 Colour-coded instrument cluster
 Cruise control
 Driver's and passenger's sports seats
 Electronic brakeforce distribution (EBD)
 FE2 sports suspension
 Front and rear power windows
 Front fog lamps
 Independent rear suspension (IRS)
 Limited slip differential (LSD)
 Power antenna
 Security system
 Side impact airbags (SIAB)
 Sports leather steering wheel
 Traction control system (TCS)
 Trip computer
 18 inch alloy wheels

Berlina 

The Berlina was the semi-luxury model of the VZ range, it sat above the Acclaim and below the Calais. Pricing for the Berlina started from A$42,900.

The Berlina features included:
 3.6 L  Alloytec V6 (172 kW in 2006, option of 5.7 L  LS1 V8 until 31 December 2005, then 6.0 L  L76 V8 from 1 January 2006)
 4-speed automatic transmission
 6 disc in-dash CD player
 Anti-lock braking system (ABS)
 Auto headlights
 Brake assist (BA)
 Climate control air conditioning
 Cruise control
 Driver's and passenger's airbags
 Electronic brake assist (EBA)
 Electronic brakeforce distribution (EBD)
 Front and rear power windows
 Independent rear suspension (IRS)
 Leather steering wheel
 Limited slip differential (LSD) (with V8)
 Power antenna
 Security system
 Side impact airbags (SIAB)
 Rear park assist
 Traction control system (TCS)
 Trip computer
 16x7 inch alloy wheels

Calais 

The Calais was the top-of-the-line, luxury model in the VZ range. It sat above the Berlina and combined luxury with performance. Pricing for the Calais started at A$52,660.

The Calais features included:
 3.6 L  Alloytec V6 (option of 5.7 L  LS1 V8 until 31 December 2005, then 260 kW (349 hp) 6.0 L L76 V8 from 1 January 2006)
 4-Speed automatic transmission (with LS1)
 5-speed automatic transmission (all other engine variants)
 6 disc in-dash CD player
 Anti-lock braking system (ABS)
 Auto headlights
 Brake assist (BA)
 Cruise control
 Driver's and passenger's airbags
 Dual zone electronic climate control
 Electronic brake assist (EBA)
 Electronic brakeforce distribution (EBD)
 Electronic stability program (ESP) (with V6)
 Front and rear power windows
 Independent rear suspension (IRS)
 Limited slip differential (LSD) (with V8)
 Luxury / sports suspension
 Power antenna
 Programmable 3-position driver preference memory (seat/climate/audio/mirrors)
 Security system
 Side impact airbags (SIAB)
 Speed-sensitive variable wipers (front)
 Sports leather steering wheel
 Rear park assist
 Traction control system (TCS)
 Trip computer
 17x8 inch alloy wheels

Adventra 
The Holden Adventra (VZ) is an all-wheel drive wagon update to the original VY II series model.

An interim VZ Adventra appeared in August 2004 at the time of the release of the VZ Commodore range, but this was in essence the familiar VY body with VZ engine, running gear, ECU and a VZ compliance plate. A true VZ series facelift was introduced in February 2005 and with it, the introduction of a V6 engine as the principal power unit. Adventra was now available in a choice of four equipment levels: SX6, CX6, LX6, and LX8, with a 3.6-litre V6 engine affording  and a five-speed automatic transmission. Production of the V8-powered Adventra ceased in December 2005, due only to the fact that Holden ceased manufacturing the Generation III power unit and did not see a strong enough business case to invest in the new 6.0-litre Generation IV V8 for the Adventra's all-wheel drive application.

Sales of the Adventra range never achieved Holden's expectations, especially in comparison to the rival Ford Territory, and it was ultimately phased out of production in 2006 to make way for the newly introduced Captiva, imported from GM Daewoo in South Korea.

Limited edition and other models

Commodore 9C1 

The Commodore 9C1, or 'Police Pack', was a special pack for the VZ Commodore that was available to all police organisations in Australia, New Zealand and several in the Middle East. It was based on the Commodore Executive with various added specification upgrades to cater for its specific role. Most 9C1s were delivered in white, though unmarked vehicles were offered in other colours.

Specification upgrades included:
 4 Airbags (Driver, Passenger, Side)
 Interior light with integrated individual map lights and
 Interior light lock-out switch (Centre console mounted button, isolates glovebox light, boot and interior dome and map reading lights)
 FE2 suspension
 15x7JJ silver painted steel rims and silver plastic centrecaps with Bridgestone 'Turanza' ER30 225/60/R15 tyres
 Black coloured dash surrounds (standard VZ Commodore Executive had greyish coloured surrounds)
 Front and rear power windows (standard VZ Commodore Executive only had front apart from higher models)
 Limited slip differential or Traction control
 Sump protector guard
 Larger higher capacity battery with 450 CCA and 115 min RC
 Police Certified Speedometer with  increments marked
 Two horns – standard 400 Hz horn plus a more powerful 450 Hz horn
 ABS
 Upgraded front brake pads (Bendix ultimate on front, PBR akebono on rear)
 Additional Wiring Loom (supplying power for beacons, siren, radios etc.)
 Additional firewall access grommets for wiring

Commodore Lumina 
The Commodore Lumina was launched in January 2005. It was based on the Commodore Executive with A$6,000 worth of additional features. 3,700 were produced and sold at a price of A$32,390 each.

Commodore Equipe 
April 2005 saw the launch of the Commodore Equipe, a Holden tradition for many recent models of the Commodore. Based on the VZ Acclaim with A$5,000 worth of extra features, it sold for A$33,490 AUD. 3,500 were produced.

Commodore SVZ 
In March 2006, Holden produced the limited edition SVZ model. This was based on the Executive sedan and wagon model with A$6,000 worth of extra features for A$32,990.

In March 2007, this model was reintroduced as a run-out model, based on the Executive wagon and base model Ute. The SVZ ute could be ordered in Morpheous (Metallic purple with pink highlights from the VE series). The SVZ wagon included the Police 193 kW engine in place of the standard  engine, as well as leather upholstery and sports additions (dash cluster, leather gearshift and steering wheel).

Commodore SSZ 
Late in 2005, Holden released 930 units of the limited edition Commodore SSZ. This model featured leather upholstery with SSZ logo, premium performance brakes, colour-coded SSZ instrument cluster, black centre-mounted voltage and oil pressure gauges, 18-inch Monaro-style wheels, Rear Parking Assist and Bluetooth, for A$49,990. The SSZ was discontinued upon arrival of the VE series.

Commercial range 

Whilst the sedan VZ range received both versions of the Alloytec V6, the Ute and Crewman range received just the lower-capacity small 3.6L V6- Alloytec 175 – it was the standard base engine across the entire ute & Crewman range, with a six-speed manual. A 4-speed automatic was also available as an option, however. Crewman vehicles were factory speed limited to 160 km/h due to the long length of driveshaft. The Crewman also suffered a larger turning circle and heavier fuel consumption than the ute, due to the longer, heavier wheelbase chassis. The One Tonner and Crewman ranges shared the same base specification models, as shown below:
 Base model Crewman/Ute adopting the specifications of the Commodore Executive. Available with 3.6-litre  Alloytec V6 – six-speed manual or four-speed automatic. 175 kW at engine flywheel, and typically 119–122 kW at the rear wheels due to drivetrain losses.
 S Crewman/Ute- based on Commodore SV6 specification. Available with 3.6-litre  Alloytec V6 – six-speed manual or four-speed automatic

The S specification was rebranded as SV6 in August 2006, and the five-speed auto from the sedan became available, with no other changes.

Based on Commodore SS specification (minus side-impact airbags on cab-chassis). Available with a 5.7-litre  Gen III V8, or the new  6.0-litre L98 – six-speed manual or four-speed auto.

The Crewman was also available in a higher spec Cross 8 form, whilst the VZ Crewman Cross 6 was essentially a lower powered, base model V6 version of the Cross 8.

The One Tonner was available with the following specifications:
 Base model adopting the specifications of the Commodore Executive. Available with 3.6-litre  Alloytec V6 – six-speed manual or four-speed automatic, or 5.7-litre  Gen III V8 – six-speed manual or four-speed automatic
 S: Based on Commodore SV6 specification minus fog-lights. Available with 3.6-litre  Alloytec V6 – six-speed manual or four-speed automatic, or 5.7-litre  Gen III V8 – six-speed manual or four-speed automatic
 Cross 6: AWD One-Tonner. Available with 3.6-litre  Alloytec V6 – four-speed automatic only
 SVZ: Based on the SV6 plus leather seats, Monaro CV8 rims. Available with 3.6-litre  Alloytec V6 – five-speed automatic or six-speed manual

To make room in the factory for the upcoming VE series, production of the One Tonner ceased in December 2005.

The Ute range continued without any updates for the next 18 months, until the January 2006 addition of Holden's new L76 V8 engines. The VZ Utes remained on sale well after the introduction of Holden's next-generation VE series, as did the VZ Wagons. By December of the same year, the Crewman and all AWD variants of the ute were gone from showrooms after Holden ceased production, and the One Tonner range was discontinued. VZ Utes were superseded by the VE series equivalent released in September 2007. Citing poor Crewman sales & uptake by consumers, Holden chose not to manufacture any long wheelbase "Crewman" crew cab VE ute models in the new VE series.

HSV range (Z Series) 

The enhanced performance VZ range sold by Holden Special Vehicles (HSV) was released in 2004 as the Z Series. Its standard range included the models listed below.

Clubsport 

There was the choice of either a Six-speed manual or four-speed auto. Fuel consumption was 15.9 L/100 km. The Z-Series started at $61,850 plus on-road costs for the manual. A Clubsport R8 was also available, with greater equipment (e.g. leather seats and extra instrument gauges) and revised wheels design and upgraded braking system.

In July 2005, HSV also produced a manual-only Clubsport and Clubsport R8 "Dealer Team Spec" (DTS), comprising Stage 1 and optional Stage 2 packages. Stage 1 included upgraded tyre and wheel package, lighter overall weight and Stage 2 included other upgrades such as enhanced driver interface, adjustable suspension and tyre pressure monitors.

The Z Series was the first range with which HSV reached the Middle East with the one-make racing ClubSport R sedans.

Senator

The Z Series no longer featured the Senator Signature nameplate. The new Senator featured a more subtle styling, with  wheels as standard. The engine was a new 6.0-litre LS2 V8 (as featured on the C6 Corvette) pushing out . Newly designed rear mufflers give the car a slightly deeper sound. The fuel economy was officially rated at 10–12 litres/100 km on the highway, and a jump to 18–22 litres/100 km through the cities.

Some of the main options included the sunroof $2390, satellite navigation $3800, rear-seat DVD players $3900, Xenon headlights $1800, tyre pressure monitoring system $1395. Inside it features Nappa leather on the seats. The braking system on the Senator comes with ABS with twin-piston front callipers and grooved discs. The specially designed rear suspension has a self-levelling feature, so if the Senator was towing a trailer, instead of the weight forcing the back down and causing the front of the car to go up, the rear suspension would harden itself and therefore keeping the car levelled for headlight aim. This feature is also on the current E-series Senator Signature and has been optioned on Holden models as far back as WH Caprice in 1999.

The chrome outline on the grill was added to give the style more of a relaxed luxury appearance. The Senator has specially designed 10 spoke alloys. For the interior special suede leather come as an optional extra. The Senator Signature name has now been dropped out of the line up, in the price department it matches the Clubsport approximately. Nappa leather is standard for the Senator. The 6.0-litre Gen3 (LS2) V8 engine was similar to the C6 Corvettes engine. The brakes are upgraded and feature Bosch ABS.

Avalanche 
The Avalanche was an all-wheel drive crossover SUV that was manufactured by Holden Special Vehicles (HSV) in 2005. Based on the Holden Adventra LX8 crossover wagon, the Avalanche range also incorporated a dual-cab utility model known as the HSV Avalanche XUV. The XUV derived from the Holden Crewman Cross8.

Both HSV vehicles were built in two series, the 2003 "Y Series II" (the wagon was actually available as of October/November 2003) and an updated version of the "Y Series II", which included some of the upgrades found in the newer "Z Series" HSV models. These later models are quite rare, with a build life of nine months from April 2005 to December 2005.

As with the related Holden VY all-wheel drive vehicles, the HSV Y Series AWD vehicles as built from September 2004 to March 2005 confusingly have Z Series compliance and Vehicle Identification Numbers; this correlates to the building of new specification Holden VZ and Z Series HSV non-AWD cars during this period.

The updated Avalanches with some of the Z Series upgrades can be externally visually differentiated from the Y Series versions by their re-profiled front bumper unit that looks less aggressive and which features a more integrated appearance to the auxiliary driving lights.

Permanent all-wheel drive was calibrated to deliver 62 percent of the power to the rear wheels, thereby maintaining a rear wheel drive feel to the handling of these vehicles.

Along with Holden's V8 Commodore-based AWD vehicles, the HSV Avalanche series was discontinued in late 2005 due to phasing out of the 5.7-litre LS1 engines because of the Euro III emissions regulations.

Maloo 

HSV's facelifted Z Series was introduced in October 2004 and featured a new LS2 6.0-litre V8 engine, producing . Along with the new engine exclusive to HSV, Z Series introduces 19" wheels, Traction Control and Multi-link rear suspension as standard equipment to the Maloo range.

In total, the Z Series built were 517 (base) and 958 (R8) and the Z Series MY06 were 181 (base) and 339 (R8).

On 25 May 2006, a standard 2006 HSV Maloo R8 driven by Mark Skaife was clocked at an averaged speed of 271.44 km/h (168.7 mph) in Woomera, South Australia.[7] The speed was recognised by the Guinness World Records representative, Chris Sheedy, as the Fastest Production Pickup Truck recorded. The speed improved over the previous record held by a Dodge Ram SRT-10 at 248.784 km/h (154.587 mph).

Limited editions 
HSV produced the following Z Series and Z Series MY06 limited editions:
 SV6000: 50 Z series units based on the Clubsport R8, 30 of which painted in "Devil Yellow" and the remainder in "Phantom Black"; March 2005
 Maloo R8 "15th Anniversary": 50 Z series units painted in "Devil Yellow", celebrating Maloo's anniversary and marketed under the "15 Years of Thunder" slogan; August 2005
 Clubsport R8 "Toll HSV Dealer Team": 50 Z Series MY06 units painted in "Phantom Black Mica" with orange stripes and decals; July 2005
 Clubsport R8 "Holden Racing Team": 50 Z Series MY06 of units painted in "Sting Red" with white stripes and decals; March 2006
 Senator Skaife Signature: 50 Z Series MY06 units painted in "Phantom Black" with chrome shadow wheel finish, special fittings and automatic transmission only; March 2006.

Exports 

Exports of the VZ sedan were made to the Middle East as the Chevrolet Lumina from 2004 as per the previous VY series. Trim levels were the Lumina LS (based on Commodore Executive), Lumina S (Commodore SV6 with 175 kW), Lumina LTZ (Berlina), and Lumina SS (Commodore SS).

As with the previous VY model, exports to Malaysia and Thailand continued in VZ form as the Chevrolet Lumina, sold in LTZ trim (based on the Holden Berlina). Exports ceased during 2005.

General Motors do Brasil imported the VZ as the Chevrolet Omega from 2005 to replace the VY-based Omega. This update was announced 9 March 2005. The Brazilian model sold as a single-specification CD model, based on the Holden Berlina with some additional Calais equipment. VZ Omega sales officially ended in 2007 when replaced by the VE-based model, as announced on 4 July 2007.

Sales 
Sales of the VZ Commodore commenced in August 2004. Whilst selling well initially, the launch of the VZ coincided with the beginning of the large car market sales decline, resulting in fewer sales than (some) of its predecessor.

{|
| 
|

Note: Figures include sales of VZ Wagons on until July 2006, but it did remain on sale until 2008.

References 

Cars of Australia
VZ
Full-size vehicles
Rear-wheel-drive vehicles
Coupé utilities
Sedans
Station wagons
Police vehicles
Cars introduced in 2004